Barbadian English or Bajan  English is a dialect of the English language as used by Barbadians (Bajans) and by Barbadian diasporas. It should not be confused with Bajan Creole, which is an English-based creole language.

Pronunciation

Barbadian English is fully rhotic and full of glottal stops. It is also notable, in comparison with standard American or British English, for the first vowel in price or prize.  

 The realization of the  vowel  in Barbadian English is pretty much the same as in American English, the default .
 The  vowel  is usually .
 The  vowel  is the same as in the US English, .
 The  vowel  is mostly . The  diaphoneme is mostly to be identified with this vowel (see trap-bath split)
 The   and   sequences are both , resulting in the near-square merger.
 The  sequence  and the  sequence  are both usually .
 The  vowel  is mostly .
 The  diphthong  is generally .
 The  and  vowels are not merged in Barbadian English.

See also
 Barbados

References

Barbados
Barbados
English